Ahlbergia frivaldszkyi is a small butterfly found in Russia and the East Palearctic that belongs to the lycaenids or blues family. The larva feeds on Spiraea japonica. It was described by Julius Lederer in 1853 as Thecla frivaldszkyi.

Description from Seitz

In 1909, Adalbert Seitz wrote:

See also
List of butterflies of Russia

References

External links

Callophrys
Butterflies described in 1853